The 49th General Assembly of Prince Edward Island was in session from March 1, 1960, to November 8, 1962. The Progressive Conservative Party led by Walter Russell Shaw formed the government.

John R. MacLean was elected speaker.

There were four sessions of the 49th General Assembly:

Members

Kings

Prince

Queens

Notes:

References
 Election results for the Prince Edward Island Legislative Assembly, 1959-09-01
 O'Handley, Kathryn Canadian Parliamentary Guide, 1994 

Terms of the General Assembly of Prince Edward Island
1960 establishments in Prince Edward Island
1962 disestablishments in Prince Edward Island